From 1914 to 1925, Maine used a system of lettered highways to designate cross-state routes. It is unclear as to whether the system lasted through the recognition of pole-marked auto trails by the State Highway Commission in 1919, both systems were abandoned by 1925 in favor of the New England interstate highway system.

List of routes 

* Indicates route not finalized by 1914 report

References 

State highways in Maine
Lists of roads in Maine